Qaleh-ye Sahar (also Romanized as Qal‘eh-ye Saḩar and Qal‘eh Sahar; also known as Qal‘eh-ye Saḩar Alhā’ī) is a village in Elhayi Rural District, in the Central District of Ahvaz County, Khuzestan Province, Iran. At the 2006 census, its population was 801, in 129 families.

References 

Populated places in Ahvaz County